Bulacan local elections were held on May 13, 2019 as part of the 2019 Philippine general election. Voters selected their candidates of choice for all local positions: a town mayor, vice mayor and town councilors, as well as members of the Sangguniang Panlalawigan, the vice-governor, governor and representatives for the four districts of Bulacan and the lone district of San Jose del Monte City.

Gubernatorial and Vice Gubernatorial election

Governor
Incumbent Governor Wilhelmino Sy-Alvarado was term-limited; he switched places with incumbent Vice-Governor Daniel Fernando, who ran for governor. Fernando's opponents are incumbent Malolos mayor Christian "Agila" Natividad and former councilor Teddy "Aguila" Natividad.

Vice Governor
Incumbent Vice-Governor Daniel Fernando was term-limited; he switched places with incumbent Governor Wilhelmino Sy-Alvarado, who will ran for Vice-Governor. Asiong Mendiola, the running mate of Teddy Natividad, withdrew his candidacy. Sy-Alvarado's opponents were Nelson dela Merced and incumbent Bocaue councilor Anjo Mendoza, son of former Bulacan governor Joselito Mendoza.

Congressional elections

1st District
Incumbent Jose Antonio Sy-Alvarado ran for his second term.

2nd District
Incumbent Gavini "Apol" Pancho ran for his third term.

3rd District
Incumbent Lorna Silverio ran for her second term. She faced former Governor and 3rd District Representative Joselito Andrew Mendoza and her late husband's son Ricardo S. Silverio, Jr.

4th District
Incumbent Linabelle Ruth Villarica was term-limited; she ran as City Mayor of Meycauayan instead. Her husband, incumbent Meycauayan City Mayor Henry Villarica ran unopposed for her seat.

San Jose del Monte
Incumbent Florida Robes ran for her second term, and won against incumbent councilor Irene del Rosario with a margin of 10,896 votes (6.52%).

Sangguniang Panlalawigan Elections
All 4 Districts of Bulacan elected members of the Bulacan Provincial Board. The first (including Malolos) and fourth (including San Jose del Monte) districts send three board members each, while the second and third districts send two board members each. Election is via plurality-at-large voting; a voter can vote up to the maximum number of board members his district is sending.

1st District 
Incumbent Board Members Ayee Ople and Toti Ople were term-limited; Incumbent Board Member Allan Andan ran for his second term. 

|-bgcolor=black
|colspan=25|

2nd District
Incumbent Board Member Buko dela Cruz was term-limited; his sister and incumbent Baliuag councilor Pechay dela Cruz ran in his stead. The husband of incumbent Board Member Baby Monet Posadas, former Senior Board Member Monet Posadas, ran in her stead.

|-bgcolor=black
|colspan=25|

3rd District
Incumbent Board Member Nono Castro is term-limited; his brother Romeo Castro ran in his place. Incumbent Board Member Emily Viceo ran for her second term.

|-bgcolor=black
|colspan=25|

4th District
Incumbent Lita delos Santos did not run for reelection; her nephew, former Board Member Jon-jon delos Santos, ran in her stead. Incumbent Board Members Alex Castro and Allan Ray Baluyut ran for their second and third terms, respectively.

|-bgcolor=black
|colspan=25|

City and Municipal Elections
All cities and municipalities of Bulacan also elected their new mayor and vice-mayor in this election. The candidates for mayor and vice mayor with the highest number of votes won the respective seats; they were voted separately, and may therefore have come from different parties. Below is the list of mayoralty candidates of each city and municipality, grouped per district.

First district
City: Malolos
Municipalities:  Bulakan, Calumpit, Hagonoy, Paombong, Pulilan

Malolos City
Incumbent Mayor Christian Natividad was term-limited and he ran for Governor. Bebong Gatchalian won with a margin of 4,545 votes (4.85%).

Incumbent Vice Mayor Gilbert "Bebong" Gatchalian was term-limited and he ran for Mayor. His running mate, incumbent Councilor Noel "Len" Pineda, faced incumbent Board Member Ayee Ople for Vice Mayor. Pineda won with a percentage of 39.42% against Toots Bautista's 30.32% and Ople's 29.80%.

Bulakan
Incumbent Mayor Patrick Neil Meneses was term-limited, and ran for Vice Mayor. His brother, incumbent Councilor Piccolo, ran for Mayor against former PBA player and JRU Heavy Bombers head coach Vergel Meneses. Vergel won with a margin of 6,993 votes (17.51%).

Incumbent Vice Mayor Alberto "Berting" Bituin was term-limited, and ran for councilor. Patrick Neil Meneses won with a margin of only 39 votes (0.1%).

Calumpit
Incumbent Mayor Jessie de Jesus ran for his third term unopposed.

Incumbent Vice Mayor Zar Candelaria was term-limited, and ran for Board Member under PDP-Laban. The candidates for Vice Mayor were incumbent Councilors Thelma Antonio-Dansalan and Victor "Aboy" de Belen.

Hagonoy
Incumbent Mayor Raulito "Amboy" Manlapaz ran for his third and final term. He faced the daughter of incumbent Governor Wilhelmino Sy-Alvarado, Ate Charo Sy-Alvarado, and ABC President Jhane dela Cruz.

Incumbent Vice Mayor Pedro Santos ran for his third consecutive term.

Paombong
Incumbent Mayor Mary Ann Marcos ran for her second term. Her opponent was former Mayor Isagani Castro.

Incumbent Vice Mayor Cristina Gonzales ran for her second term.

Pulilan
Incumbent Mayor Maritz Ochoa-Montejo ran for her second term unopposed.

Incumbent Vice Mayor Ricardo "Rec" Candido ran for his second term against incumbent Councilor Enoc "Jayjay" Santos.

Second district
Municipalities: Balagtas, Baliuag, Bocaue, Bustos, Guiguinto, Pandi, Plaridel

Balagtas
Incumbent Mayor Eladio "JR" Gonzales ran for his second term.

Incumbent Vice Mayor Alberto "Bobby" Carating ran for his second term.

Baliuag
Incumbent Mayor Ferdinand Estrella ran for his second term against former Mayor Carolina Dellosa.

Incumbent Vice Mayor Christopher Clemente ran for his third term.

Bocaue
Incumbent Mayor Eleanor "Joni" Villanueva-Tugna ran for her second term against former Provincial Administrator Jim Valerio.

 

Incumbent Vice Mayor Aldrin Sta. Ana ran for Councilor. Mayor Villanueva's running mate was incumbent Councilor Noriel German who was up against former Vice Mayor Jose Santiago, Jr.

Bustos
Incumbent Mayor Arnel Mendoza was term-limited and ran for Vice Mayor.

Incumbent Vice Mayor Ading Leoncio ran for Mayor. Incumbent Mayor Arnel Mendoza ran against former Vice Mayor Loida Rivera and incumbent Councilor Romulo Lazaro.

Guiguinto
Incumbent Mayor Ambrosio "Boy" Cruz ran for his third term. His opponent was incumbent Vice Mayor Banjo Estrella.

Incumbent Vice Mayor Banjo Estrella ran for Mayor. The candidates for Vice Mayor were incumbent Councilors JJ Santos and Ricky Jose

Pandi
Incumbent Mayor Tinoy Marquez ran for his second term. Among his opponents was former Mayor Rico Roque.

Incumbent Vice Mayor Noel Roxas ran for his second term.

Plaridel
Former Mayor Anastacia "Tessie" Vistan, mother of incumbent Mayor Jocell Vistan-Casaje, ran unopposed.

Incumbent Vice Mayor Imelda "Mhel" Gatdula-de Leon ran for her second term unopposed.

Third district
Municipalities: Angat, Doña Remedios Trinidad, Norzagaray, San Ildefonso, San Miguel, San Rafael

Angat
Incumbent Mayor Leonardo de Leon ran for his third and final term.

Incumbent Vice Mayor Gilberto "Reggie" Santos ran for his second term against former Vice Mayor Reynante "Jowar" Bautista.

Doña Remedios Trinidad
Incumbent Mayor Ronaldo Flores was term-limited, and ran for Vice Mayor; his wife Marita ran for Mayor.

Incumbent Vice Mayor Larry Cruz ran for his second term.

Norzagaray
Incumbent mayor Fred Germar ran for his third term. He had been removed from office for grave misconduct on August 10, 2016, a decision reversed by the Supreme Court on November 23, 2018. His opponents were the incumbent vice mayor and former acting mayor Ade Cristobal and former mayor Matilde Legaspi.

Incumbent councilor Boyet Santos ran for a full term as vice mayor; he was elected as the top Municipal Councilor in 2016, and as such had been acting vice mayor while Germar was out of office.

San Ildefonso
Incumbent Mayor Carla Galvez-Tan ran for her second term even as she was suspended for 9 months on 29 August 2018. She was up against her cousin, former Mayor Gerald Galvez.

Incumbent Vice Mayor and Acting Mayor Luis Sarrondo ran for his second term. He was up against incumbent Councilor and Acting Vice Mayor Zander Galvez and incumbent Councilor Rocky Sarmiento.

San Miguel

Incumbent Mayor Marivee Mendez-Coronel ran for her second term against former Mayor Roderick Tiongson and Atty. Jose Francisco S. Cabochan.

Incumbent Vice Mayor John "Bong" Alvarez ran for his second term.

San Rafael
Incumbent Mayor Cipriano "Goto" Violago ran for his third and final term.

 

Incumbent Vice Mayor Edison Veneracion ran for his third and final term.

Fourth district
Cities: Meycauayan, San Jose del Monte
Municipalities: Marilao, Obando, Santa Maria

Meycauayan City

Incumbent Mayor Henry Villarica ran for Representative of the 4th district; his wife, Deputy Speaker and incumbent Representative Linabelle Villarica, ran for Mayor.

Incumbent Vice Mayor Rafael "Jojo" Manzano was term-limited; his party nominated incumbent Councilor Jojie Violago, who ran unopposed.

Marilao

Incumbent Mayor Juanito "Tito" Santiago did not seek reelection; his party nominated former Municipal ABC President Ricky Silvestre.

Incumbent Vice Mayor Henry Lutao ran for his second term.

Obando
Incumbent Mayor Edwin Santos ran for his third and final term against incumbent Councilor Artus Sayao.

Incumbent Vice Mayor Arvin dela Cruz ran for his second term against former Vice Mayor Danilo de Ocampo.

Santa Maria

Incumbent Mayor Russell Pleyto ran for his second term against former Mayors Bartolome "Omeng" Ramos and Jesus "Ato" Mateo.

Incumbent Vice Mayor Ricky Buenaventura ran for his second term against incumbent Councilor Nelson Luciano.

San Jose del Monte City

Incumbent Mayor Arthur Robes ran for his second term against former City Mayor Reynaldo San Pedro.

Incumbent Vice Mayor Efren Bartolome Jr. ran for his second term unopposed.

References

2019 Philippine local elections
Elections in Bulacan
May 2019 events in the Philippines
2019 elections in Central Luzon